The 1967 Tulsa Golden Hurricane football team represented the University of Tulsa during the 1967 NCAA University Division football season. In their seventh year under head coach Glenn Dobbs, the Golden Hurricane compiled a 7–3 record, 3–1 against conference opponents, and finished in second place in the Missouri Valley Conference.

The team's statistical leaders included Mike Stripling with 1,271 passing yards, Cee Ellison with 661 rushing yards, and Rick Eber with 1,168 receiving yards.

Schedule

References

Tulsa
Tulsa Golden Hurricane football seasons
Tulsa Golden Hurricane football